

The Hellenistic World

Poets (by date of birth)
 Aratus of Soli (c. 315/310 - 240 BC), Macedonia, in Greek
 Theocritus (c. 310 - c. 250 BC), in Greek
 Callimachus (c. 305 - c. 240 BC), Alexandria, in Greek

Works

China

Poets (by date of birth)
 Qu Yuan (340 - 278 BC)

Works
 Chu Ci, the second great anthology of early Chinese poetry

References

Poetry by century
Poetry